WORD OF THE VOICE is FLOW's fifteenth single. Its A-Side was used as the second opening theme song for Persona -trinity soul-. It reached #15 on the Oricon charts in its first week and charted for 6 weeks. *

Track listing

References

2008 songs
Ki/oon Music singles
Flow (band) songs